Pammene gallicolana is a species of moth of the family Tortricidae. It is found in northern Russia and Latvia and from Germany to Italy and Greece.

The wingspan is 11–14 mm. Adults are on wing at the end of July.

The larvae live as an inquiline in wasp galls on Quercus species.

Taxonomy
Pammene macrolepis (described from Rhodes in Greece) is mostly treated as a synonym of Pammene gallicolana, although some authors treat it as a valid species. It may also prove to be a subspecies.

References

Moths described in 1846
Grapholitini
Moths of Europe